Vinyl Goddess from Mars is a 2D platform game published by Union Logic Software Publishing, Inc and developed by Six Pound Sledge Studios. It was released for DOS in 1995.

The game has three episodes (with only the first episode playable in the shareware version):
Episode I: Forests of Old
Episode II: Caverns of Chaos
Episode III: The Return

Debra Dare was the model for the box cover art, introduction screen, and pin-up poster.

Plot
It is the year 200 billion. Vinyl is on her way to an intergalactic B-movie convention, when her spaceship is struck by a meteor shower. She crash lands on an unknown planet full of dangers.

Development
The game was created by Jason Struck and Mark Lewis, and was originally intended to be a sequel to Epic MegaGames's Jill of the Jungle. However, Epic was not satisfied with the quality of the game, and decided to release Jazz Jackrabbit instead. The story was then changed, and the game was published by Union Logic as an original title.

Reception
In a 2009 review, Clint Basinger of Lazy Game Reviews called this "...one of the most solid side-scrolling platform games that I have played on a PC, or anywhere, really." He praised the game's graphics, controls, music, and tongue-in-cheek writing. However, he objected to the game's lackluster text-only ending.

References

External links

Cover Art (German)
Shareware version at ClassicDOSGames.com

1995 video games
DOS games
DOS-only games
Video games featuring female protagonists
Video games developed in Canada

Single-player video games